The 1965–66 Honduran Liga Nacional season was the inaugural edition of the Honduran Liga Nacional.  The season ran from 18 July 1965 to 23 January 1966.  The format of the tournament consisted of a double round-robin schedule.  Platense F.C. won the title after defeating España 2–0 in the last round at El Progreso.

Background
In 1964, a triangular tournament was organized between three clubs from the Liga Dionisio de Herrera between C.D.S. Vida, C.D. Victoria and C.D. Atlántida; having Vida qualified for the 1965–66 league.

1965–66 teams

 Atlético Español (Tegucigalpa)
 España (San Pedro Sula)
 Honduras (El Progreso)
 La Salle (San Pedro Sula)
 Marathón (San Pedro Sula)
 Motagua (Tegucigalpa)
 Olimpia (Tegucigalpa)
 Platense (Puerto Cortés)
 Troya (Tegucigalpa)
 Vida (La Ceiba)

Regular season

Standings

 Winners: Platense (won regular season)
 Runners-up: Olimpia
 Last: Atlético Español (no relegation)

Round 1

Round 2

Round 3

Round 4

Round 5

Round 6

Round 7

Round 8

Top scorer
  Henry Grey Fúnez (La Salle) with 14 goals

Squads

Curiosities
On 24 October 1965, the match between F.C. Motagua and C.D. España was interrupted for several minutes due to a deflated ball.  Since there were no additional balls, the match had to be briefly suspended while the only ball was being re-inflated in a close by gas station.

References

Liga Nacional de Fútbol Profesional de Honduras seasons
1965–66 in Honduran football
Honduras